Olano is a hamlet and council located in the municipality of Zigoitia, in Álava province, Basque Country, Spain. As of 2020, it has a population of 21.

Geography 
Olano is located 15km north-northwest of Vitoria-Gasteiz.

References

Populated places in Álava